The Araneomorphae (also called the Labidognatha) are an infraorder of spiders. They are distinguishable by chelicerae (fangs) that point diagonally forward and cross in a pinching action, in contrast to the Mygalomorphae (tarantulas and their close kin), where they point straight down. Araneomorphs comprise the vast majority of living spiders.

Distinguishing characteristics 
Most spider species are Araneomorphae, which have fangs that face towards each other, increasing the orientations they can employ during prey capture. They have fewer book lungs (when present), and the females typically live one year. 

The Mygalomorphae have fangs that face towards the ground, and which are parallel to the long axis of the spider's body, thus they have only one orientation they can employ during prey capture. They have four pairs of book lungs, and the females often live many years.

Spiders included 
Almost all of the familiar spiders are included in the Araneomorphae group, the major exception being the Tarantulas. There are a few other  Mygalomorphae species that live around homes or gardens, but they typically are relatively small and not easily noticed.

The Araneomorphae, to the contrary, include the weavers of spiral webs; the cobweb spiders that live in the corners of rooms, and between windows and screens; the crab spiders that lurk on the surfaces of flowers in gardens; the jumping spiders that are visible hunting on surfaces; the wolf spiders that carpet hunting sites in sunny spots; and the large huntsman spiders.

Systematics 
In older schemes, the Araneomorphae were divided into two lineages, the Hypochilae (containing only the family Hypochilidae), and the Neocribellatae. The Neocribellatae were in turn divided into the Austrochiloidea, and the two series Haplogynae and Entelogynae, each containing several superfamilies. Molecular phylogenetic studies have shown that the Haplogyne in particular are not a monophyletic group. A 2020 study suggested the relationships among the major groups were as shown in the following cladogram.

The blue bar to the right shows the former Haplogynae in the sense of Coddington (2005).

Table of families

Notes

References

Citations

External links